The .44 S&W American (commonly called the .44 American) is an American centerfire revolver cartridge.

Description
Used in the Smith & Wesson Model 3, it was introduced around 1869. Between 1871 and 1873, the .44 Model 3 was used as the standard United States Army sidearm. It was also offered in the Merwin Hulbert & Co. Army revolvers.

The cartridge used an outside lubricated heeled bullet, either Boxer or Berdan priming, and both black and smokeless powder loadings. The heeled bullets make the cartridge incompatible with .44 Russian, .44 Special, and .44 Magnum, which was made larger in diameter and longer to cover the exposed part of the bullet.

Its power resembles the .41 Long Colt, .32-20 Winchester, or .44-40 Winchester, and it could be used to hunt small game at short range.

The .44 American ceased to be commercially available around 1940. It can be handloaded by shortening and reforming .41 Magnum cases.

During the gunfight at the O.K. Corral on October 26, 1881, Wyatt Earp carried an 8-inch Model 3 in .44 American. Earp had received the weapon as a gift from Tombstone, Arizona, mayor and Tombstone Epitaph newspaper editor John Clum.

See also
List of cartridges by caliber
Table of handgun and rifle cartridges
11mm caliber

References

Sources
Barnes, Frank C., ed. by John T. Amber. ".44 S&W American", in Cartridges of the World, pp. 167 & 177. Northfield, IL: DBI Books, 1972. .
Barnes, Frank C., ed. by John T. Amber. ".32-20 Winchester" in Cartridges of the World, p. 46. Northfield, IL: DBI Books, 1972. .
Barnes, Frank C., ed. by John T. Amber. ".44-40 Winchester" in Cartridges of the World, p. 61. Northfield, IL: DBI Books, 1972. .

Pistol and rifle cartridges
Smith & Wesson cartridges